The Dutch Code of Civil Procedure comprises four books covering topics relating to court civil procedure.

The four books cover:
 The procedures of the district courts (Rechtbank), the superior courts (Gerechthof), and the Dutch High Court (Hoge Raad der Nederlanden)
 Enforcement of judgments, orders, and legislation
 Case law
 Arbitration

See also
Dutch Civil Code

External links
 Code of Civil Procedure (applicable in case of digital litigation) 
 Code of Civil Procedure (applicable in case of non-digital litigation) 

Codes of civil procedure
Law of the Netherlands